USS Unicorn (SS-436), a World War II Tench-class submarine, was the second submarine of the United States Navy to be given that name for the narwhal, an Arctic marine cetacean with a single tusk suggesting the horn of a unicorn and sometimes called the "sea unicorn." Like the first USS Unicorn (SS-429), she was not completed.

Unicorns keel was laid down on 25 April 1945 by the Electric Boat Company of Groton, Connecticut. The contract to build her was cancelled on 7 January 1946; however, it was reinstated on 26 February 1946 for "completion of specific items," and she was launched on 1 August 1946 sponsored by Mrs. William A. Rowan, and accepted by the Navy on 3 September 1946.

Towed to the Portsmouth Naval Shipyard at Kittery, Maine, on 15 September 1946, Unicorn was moved to New London, Connecticut, two months later and assigned to the Atlantic Reserve Fleet, New London. She remained out of commission, in reserve, until 29 July 1958, when she was stricken from the Naval Vessel Register and sold for scrap.

References

External links
 Photo gallery at navsource.org

Tench-class submarines
Ships built in Groton, Connecticut
Cancelled ships of the United States Navy
1946 ships